Merle Bettenhausen (born June 9, 1943) is a former American race car driver. The second oldest member of the Bettenhausen racing family, he is the son of Tony Bettenhausen and the brother of Gary Bettenhausen and Tony Bettenhausen Jr.

Merle's USAC Champ Car racing career was brief and tragic. Three laps into his first Champ Car race on a paved track, Michigan International Speedway on July 16, 1972, he tangled with Mike Hiss and crashed into the outside wall. The car exploded in flames and Merle tried to climb out while it was still moving. His right arm became trapped between the car and the wall and was torn off.

He currently resides in Indianapolis and works in the retail automobile business. He has a son, Ryan Bettenhausen, and daughter, Tracy Jennings.

Notes

1943 births
Living people
People from Tinley Park, Illinois
Racing drivers from Illinois
Bettenhausen family
USAC Silver Crown Series drivers